Hestad is a village in the municipality of Dønna in Nordland county, Norway. Hæstad Church is located in the village. Norwegian County Road 828 runs through the village along the coast of the island.

References

Dønna
Villages in Nordland